Wisconsin Highway 192 (WIS 192) was a short state highway in Wisconsin. It traveled from WIS 50 to WIS 43 (later WIS 142 to Interstate 43).

Route description
Starting at WIS 50, WIS 192 began to travel northward. Going north to the southeast corner of the Kenosha Regional Airport, it then intersected WIS 158. Going further north, it then ended at WIS 142 (now CTH-S).

History
Starting in 1947, WIS 192 was formed. Initially, it traveled from WIS 50 to WIS 43. During its existence, its routing had not been changed significantly. Meanwhile, in 1974, WIS 43 became WIS 142 due to the creation of I-43. In 1990, the route became decommissioned. Today, it is signed as part of CTH-H.

Major intersections

Reference

192
Transportation in Kenosha County, Wisconsin